The Treason Act 1554 (1 & 2 Ph & M c 10) was an Act of the Parliament of England. It is not to be confused with two other Acts about treason passed in the same year, 1 & 2 Ph & M c 9 and 11 (summarised below).

Long title
The long title was "An Acte wherby certayne Offences bee made Treasons; and also for the Government of the Kinges and Quenes Majesties Issue." The words in the long title of the Act from "and also" were repealed on 30 July 1948 by the Statute Law Revision Act 1948.

Provisions

Section 1 to 6 - Protection of King Philip

The Act provided legal protection to King Philip, who had married Queen Mary I on 25 July 1554 and became co-monarch of England and Ireland. It became an offence to "compass or imagine to deprive the King's Majesty from the having with the Queen the style, honour and kingly name, or to destroy the King, or to levy war within this realm against the King or Queen," or to say that the King ought not to have his title. The penalty for a first offence was forfeiture of goods and "perpetual imprisonment". A second offence was high treason. However to "compass or imagine the death of the King" or to remove him from government was high treason on a first offence.

The Act also declared that if Mary died and her heir was not yet 18 if male, or was under 15 and unmarried if female, then Philip would govern the realm until the heir to the throne came of age (or was married, if female). In that event, it would be treason to "compass, attempt, and go about to destroy the person of the King, or to remove his Highness from the government".

Section 7 - Procedure

Section 7 required trials for "any treason" (not just treason under this Act) to be conducted in accordance with the common law, "and not otherwise".

Section 8 - Misprision of treason

Section 8 provided that the concealment or keeping secret of treason constituted misprision of treason but not treason:

Sections 9 to 12 - Further procedure

Section 9 preserved privilege of peerage — the right of peers of the realm to be tried by their peers. Section 10 stipulated that offences against the Act which were committed "only by preaching or words" must be prosecuted within six months.

Section 11 created a new rule of evidence for cases of treason under this Act (but not other treasons). It required all of the witnesses against the defendant (or at least two of them) to attend court to give evidence against him in person, "if living and within the realm". (The rule did not apply if the defendant pleaded guilty.) Different versions of this two witnesses rule were adopted in the Sedition Act 1661, the Treason Act 1695, and eventually in Article Three of the United States Constitution. The rule was first enacted in the Treason Act 1547.

Section 12 made similar provision to section 7.

Section 13 - Accessories

Section 13 provided the rule for how accessories were to be treated for aiding and abetting a crime for which the penalty depended on whether it was the defendant's first or second offence. An accessory was to receive the same penalty as the principal offender, regardless of whether the accessory had committed the offence before.

Repeals

The Act, except sections 6 and 8, was repealed on 28 July 1863 by the Statute Law Revision Act 1863.

The whole Act was repealed by the Criminal Law Act 1967.

Ireland

The Act was adopted by the Parliament of Ireland in 1556.

Other treason legislation in 1554

Two other Acts concerning treason were passed in 1554: 1 & 2 Ph & M c 9 and 1 & 2 Ph & M c 11. The former made it treason to "pray or desire that God will shorten the Queen's days". The latter made it treason to import counterfeit coins and returned the rules of evidence to what they had been before the Treason Act 1547.

See also
High treason in the United Kingdom
Treason Act

References

External links
 The Treason Act 1554, Danby Pickering, The Statutes at Large, 1763, vol. 6, pp. 53 – 55 (from Google Book Search)

Acts of the Parliament of England (1485–1603)
1554 in law
Treason in England
1554 in England
16th century in England